East High School is a public secondary school in Duluth, Minnesota, United States. It educates students in grades nine through twelve. It first opened its doors in 1927 as a junior high school. In 1950, it became a senior high school to serve the growing student population.

Duluth East High School employs a schedule that allows students to take six 50-minute classes a day. It also offers an optional zero hour, for students to take a schedule of seven classes. There are limited options for taking zero hour courses, and they are held before the official start of the school day and offerings for this extra hour typically include music, health, and some science courses.

Duluth East High School offers many courses to serve its students. These courses include Advanced Placement (AP) classes, Post Secondary Enrollment Options (PSEO), College in the Schools (CITS), vocational classes, special education, honors, and basic classes.

As part of the Duluth Public Schools "Red Plan," East High School was moved into the renovated and expanded Ordean Middle School building in 2011.  Ordean East Middle School was moved into the former East High School building located at 2900 East Fourth Street.

Extracurricular activities
Several extracurricular activities are available to students. These activities include athletic teams, clubs and organizations, and academic teams.

Clubs and organizations

References

External links
Duluth East High School website

Educational institutions established in 1927
High schools in Duluth, Minnesota
Public high schools in Minnesota
1927 establishments in Minnesota